The Eurocopter EC130 (now Airbus Helicopters H130) is a single engine light utility helicopter developed from the earlier Eurocopter AS350 Écureuil, one of the primary changes from which was the adoption of a Fenestron anti-torque device in place of a conventional tail rotor. It was launched and produced by the Eurocopter Group, which would later be rebranded as Airbus Helicopters.

Development

During the 1980s, there was considerable interest within French aerospace manufacturer Aerospatiale to further develop their successful AS350 B3 Écureuil rotorcraft, which had been originally developed in the early 1970s. On 6 February 1987, a prototype AS350 Z (a modified AS350 B2) conducted its first flight with a Fenestron tail-rotor fitted in the place of its conventional counterpart. The AS350 Z test program stretched across several years, the aircraft receiving additional modifications such as a new air intake based on that of the Eurocopter EC120. The AS350 Z contributed to the overall development of the fenestron tail rotor.

In the early 1990s, development of the new rotorcraft continued under Eurocopter, Aerospatiale having merged into the multinational Eurocopter organisation. On 24 June 1999, the first prototype EC130 performed its first flight, being flown from an airfield in France by Steven Page, an Australian test pilot. Major changes from the preceding AS350 included the adoption of a dual-hydraulic system, the enclosed Fenestron anti-torque device, and a wide main body to provide for a cabin with considerably greater internal space.

The EC130 was designed in close cooperation with tour operators, one such operator, Blue Hawaiian Helicopters, being the launch operator; it has been described as having a spacious cabin for accommodating up to seven tourists and providing excellent external visibility. In 2001, the EC130 entered service with Blue Hawaiian Helicopters, being used for aerial tours of scenic areas such as Hawaii and the Grand Canyon. The EC130 is principally aimed at commercial passenger transportation operators, such as aerial tour companies, whereas the preceding AS350 continued to be produced and marketed for utility operations instead.

Vertical Magazine described the EC130 as being "one of the most highly successful single engine helicopters in air medical service".

In February 2012, Eurocopter formally unveiled the EC130 T2, an upgraded variant of the EC130 featuring the more powerful Turbomeca Arriel 2D turboshaft engine. Improving upon the base model's performance; more than 70% of the EC130 T2's airframe differed from the initial EC130 model, changes to improve passenger conditions such as an active vibration control system and better air conditioning systems were adopted, while fuel consumption is claimed to be reduced by 14 per cent. In 2012, Eurocopter received orders for 50 EC130 T2 from Maverick Helicopters, and other customers such as Papillon and Blue Hawaiian took the total then on order for the new variant to 105.

The EC130 T2 was introduced to service in 2012. In 2013, Airbus Helicopters reported that a production rate of 50 EC130 T2s would be produced that year, and that this was expected to rise to 65 per year in 2014. In August 2013, Airbus Helicopter's Brazilian subsidiary Helibras assembled its first EC130 T2; the first Australian-assembled EC130 T2 followed in December 2013.

In 2021, Airbus tested a hybrid electric assist in an H130 to extend reaction time up to 30 seconds during transition to autorotation after engine failure.

Design
The EC130 is a single-engine helicopter. It uses an automatically varying three-bladed Starflex main rotor which is matched to an enclosed tail fan anti-torque device, known as a Fenestron, the latter feature replacing the traditional tail rotor found on the older AS350. The Fenestron has unevenly spaced blades to reduce noise generation by 50% compared to a tail rotor; this enabled an FAA Appendix H fly-over noise signature of 84.3 EPNdB, 8.5 dB below stage two limits. The EC130 uses the Turbomeca Arriel 2D turboshaft engine; the performance of this powerplant has led to the type having been described as possessing "better power margins and range than competing models, particularly in hot and high conditions". The EC130 T2's enhanced Arriel engine is equipped with Full Authority Digital Engine Controls; a dual hydraulic system derived from the Eurocopter AS355 was also adopted.

The EC130 was designed with various avionics and safety features, including flight data recorders, crash-worthy seats, and redundant flight systems for greater reliability; the EC130 T2 had further safety features installed. Vertical Magazine described the cockpit instrumentation as being "straightforward" and the control response as "tight and pleasant". Piloting aids such as the Vehicle and Engine Multifunction Display (VEMD) is claimed to reduced pilot workload, thereby increasing ease-of-use and overall safety. Dependent on customer demand and role, tactical instrumentation and equipment consoles may also be installed in the cockpit. Typically the cockpit is configured for single pilot operations, the pilot being seated on the left-hand side of the forward cabin to reduce the risk of passenger interference with the controls posed by a right-hand position; dual controls can be optionally installed. The EC130 is equipped with integrated visual flight rules (VFR) equipment coupled to a Global Positioning System (GPS) receiver, making it readily capable of flight under both day and night conditions.

The EC130 reportedly has the largest cabin of any single engine helicopter in its class, with reportedly 54 per cent greater unobstructed space and 143 per cent more baggage space than the competing Bell 407. On the EC130, there are three prime seating configurations; a standard layout with a single pilot and six passengers, a similar arrangement with the two central seats facing aft, and a high density layout with three front passengers seats in line with the pilot. The EC130 was the first rotorcraft to become available with the business executive-orientated Stylence cabin configuration. The EC130 T2 is equipped with active anti-vibration control systems adapted from the Eurocopter EC225 Super Puma, these comprise five accelerometers and four linear actuators to produce smooth flight conditions and improved comfort for passengers on board. The EC130 can also be quickly configured between passenger and freight configurations.

In the emergency medical services (EMS) role, various interior configurations have been developed for the type; optional equipment includes customised mounting points for medical equipment, air compressors and liquid oxygen tanks, and United Rotorcraft’s Lowered Patient Loading System (LPLS). The EC130 has been popular with Air medical services (AMS) operators due to its large cabin being capable of accommodating up to two stretchers and two attendees, as well as a baggage area for storing equipment, wide side doors for access, and its enclosed Fenestron tail for safety. For law enforcement roles, the ability for various optional equipment to be installed on the EC130 is promoted, such as electro-optical systems, forward-looking infrared (FLIR) cameras, and search lights. In a cargo capacity, it is common for the rotorcraft to be fitted with additional external mirrors and a cargo sling.

Operational history

In 2007, it was reported that the strongest demands for the EC130 and other such single-engine helicopters has come from Latin American and North American markets. By May 2008, the EC130 had overtaken the Bell 206 as the best-selling single-engine rotorcraft on the market. In 2012, Flight International referred to the EC130 as being one of Eurocopter's best-selling rotorcraft, noting that 238 orders had been placed in 2011, a 40 per cent increase over the previous year.

In 2007, an EC130 was used as a test aircraft in a large-scale flight test campaign to trial new noise-minimising (both externally and internally) flight procedures through the typical flight envelope, including during take-off, approach, and while at cruise.

In February 2008, it was announced that aerial tour operator Maverick Helicopters' fleet of 28 EC130s, the largest single operator in the world, had accumulated a combined total of 60,000 flight hours. By March 2015, Maverick's fleet was officially recognised as having attained 300,000 flying hours. Maverick also served as the launch customer for the improved EC130 T2. By 2015, Airbus Helicopters reported that the EC130 was in service with 279 operators and had accumulated more than 1,177,000 total flight hours worldwide.

In February 2016, Indonesian industrial estate developer Jababeka signed a memorandum of understanding for up to 12 H130s for an intercity shuttle service between Jakarta and Cikarang.

Variants
EC130 B4
Initial launch model of the type.

EC130 T2
Upgraded variant of the EC130 B4; upgraded features such as improved air conditioning, full-flat floor, a more powerful engine (Turbomeca Arriel 2D) providing 10% more average power, and an anti-vibration system.
ACH130
VIP version of the H130

Operators

 CalvinAir Helicopters

 12 Apostles Helicopters

Impress Aviation

 Royal Bhutan Helicopter Services

 Paraná State Police

Ontario Ministry Of Natural Resources

 Heli Securite

 Heli Air Monaco

 Heli Holland

 Air Zermatt

Blue Hawaiian Helicopters
Broward County Sheriff's Office
Air Methods Corporation
Lutheran Health Network

Notable accidents and incidents 

 On 2 January 2023, two EC130B4s operated by Sea World Helicopters collided in Gold Coast, Queensland, Australia, killing four people and injuring eight.

Specifications (EC130 T2)

See also

References

External links

 Eurocopter EC130 Ecureuil page
 Airbus Helicopters H130 official website
 The ECOSTAR: A new era in Helicopter Tourism

Airbus Helicopters aircraft
1990s international civil utility aircraft
1990s French helicopters
Fantail helicopters
Single-turbine helicopters
Aircraft first flown in 1999